Alidoosti is a surname. Notable people with the surname include:

Hamid Alidoosti (born 1956), Iranian footballer and manager
Taraneh Alidoosti (born 1984), Iranian actress